Paula Tallal (born 1947) is a Rutgers Board of Governors Professor of Neuroscience and co-director of the Center for Molecular and Behavioral Neuroscience (CMBN) at Rutgers University in Newark, New Jersey.
Tallal is a participant on scientific advisory boards and government committees for both learning disabilities and developmental language disorders.

Research
In 1996, Tallal co-founded the Scientific Learning Corporation, the producer of the educational software Fast ForWord. Considered an expert in phonological processing, her research into dyslexia and other word encoding disorders has led to the publication of over 150 papers on the topic of language and learning.

Awards

- Co-Director Education and Outreach, Temporal Dynamic of Learning Center, National Science Foundation, 2006–2008

- Co-Principal Investigator, Santa Fe Institute Consortium, "Increasing Human Potential Initiative," 2002-2005.

- Presidential Symposium Speaker, Society for Neuroscience

- Women of Influence Award, NJBIZ, 2003

- Board of Governors Professor of Neuroscience Award, 2000

Education
B.A. New York University, 1969

Ph.D. Cambridge University, England 1973

Resources
Rutgers Women in Science, Engineering, and Mathematics

References

External links
Interview with Paula Tallal on neuroscience, phonology and reading: the oral to written language continuum

1947 births
Living people
New York University alumni
Rutgers University faculty
Behavioral neuroscientists
American neuroscientists
American women neuroscientists
Dyslexia researchers
American women academics
21st-century American women